Oglet Khefifa is a locality in Sfax Governorate southern Tunisia, located in the semi arid area south of Sfax.

Ruins at Oglet Khefifa have previously been identified with Macomades now thought to be  little farther to the north, at Henchir el Ghorib .

An interpretation of the text of the life of St. Fulgence makes identification with the remains of ancient Bennefa more probable.

References

Archaeological sites in Tunisia
Catholic titular sees in Africa
Former Roman Catholic dioceses in Africa
Roman towns and cities in Tunisia